Karl Olive (born 29 March 1969) is a French sports journalist, television producer, entrepreneur and politician. He was elected Member of Parliament for Yvelines's 12th constituency in the 2022 election. Brigitte Olive is his sister.

See also 

 List of deputies of the 16th National Assembly of France

References 

1969 births
Living people
La République En Marche! politicians
The Republicans (France) politicians
Union for a Popular Movement politicians
Chevaliers of the Légion d'honneur
French sports journalists
French television producers

Members of Parliament for Yvelines
21st-century French politicians
Deputies of the 16th National Assembly of the French Fifth Republic